The Kamfundwa Mine (or Kamoya South II Mine) is one of the Kambove mines in the mining region around Kambove, Katanga Province, Democratic Republic of the Congo.

Secret mine

The Kamoya South II Mine was opened in 1998 as a benched open cut secret mine.
The "owners" of the mine employed a strict security force to prevent the miners taking specimens.
In early 2001, it was reported that the mine started to produce carrollite crystals of extraordinary size and quality.
Some single crystals were almost as large as baseballs.
In fact, many specimens of carrollite were falsely attributed to Kamfundwa when it was still a secret location.

Ownership and development

Development partners were Harambee Mining Corp, the Swiss company Sogemin and the state-owned Gécamines.
Harambee was prime for developing the copper-cobalt deposit at Kamfundwa.
A stockpile of about 300,000 tonnes of ore grading 4% copper and 0.3% cobalt had been built up.
The mine is now owned by Gécamines.
As of 2008 annual capacity was reported to be 400,000 tonnes copper in ore and 48,000 tonnes cobalt in ore.
Ore is transported to the concentrator at Kambove for processing.

References

Copper mines in the Democratic Republic of the Congo
Cobalt mines in the Democratic Republic of the Congo
Mining in Haut-Katanga Province
Underground mines in the Democratic Republic of the Congo
1998 establishments in the Democratic Republic of the Congo
Non-renewable resource companies established in 1998